And the Oskar Goes To... is a 2019 Indian Malayalam-language drama film written and directed by Salim Ahamed and starring Tovino Thomas.

Plot 
Issak Ebrahem is a young man who wants to become a film director. Issak decides to direct and co-produce a film based on a previous screenplay based on the life of his native Moidukka. Issak mortgages the land he received as part of the property for the money needed for the construction. Then to actor Aravind and cinematographer Sivakumar Tells this story and agrees that they can make a movie. Although he suffers from a lack of money during filming, he eventually completes his first film, 'Sky of Minnamungungs'. Issak, with the help of Sivakumar, submits the film for the award on the last day to apply for the national award. At that year's National Awards, Aravindan won the Best Actor award and the film won the Best Picture award. Issak's film is officially submitted by India to compete for that year's Academy Award for Best Foreign Language Film. Following this, Maria, a representative of a foreign marketing company, sees Isaac's picture.

Prince, a friend of Issak, who had gone abroad) And introduced Prince to the screening of the film. Although a few screenings have been successful, Maria angrily treats Issak after failing to pay Issak immediately, and quarrels with Issak and the Prince over the lack of food for the final guests. Prince, who is very passionate about the movie, is in a lot of pain over this incident. Days later, Issak finds out that his picture is not on the final list for the Oscars and is about to return home. Issak completes the story of his new film, The Oscar Goes To, based on his experiences there before leaving. Returning home, Issak first visits Moiduka. He also meets his son Harshad at Moiduka's house. The film ends with the return of Moiduka's son who was imprisoned abroad in the movie Minnaminungukalude Aakasham. But Moiduka tells Issak that Harshad has not actually returned to full health. Issak apologizes to Moiduka and leaves the house.

Cast

Tovino Thomas as Issak Ebrahem
Anu Sithara as Chithra
Nikki Rae Hallow as Maria
Siddique as Prince
Vijayaraghavan as Ebrahim
Salim Kumar as Moidukka 
Sreenivasan as Aravindan
Lal as Shivakumar
Santhosh Keezhattoor as Basheer
Dinesh Prabhakar as Kabeer
Appani Sarath as Manuraman
Parvathi T. as Khadeeja
Kavitha Nair as Film actress Seetha
Anu Joseph as Sameera
Zarina Wahab as Ummunkulsu
Jaffar Idukki as Pareethikka
Hareesh Kanaran as Babumon

Release
The Hindu wrote that "Many of the scenes have ‘artificial’ written all over it, with the badly written dialogues making it even worse". Manorama Online wrote that "The biggest strength of 'And The Oscar Goes To' lies within the team. The actors -- Siddique, Anu Sithara, Salim Kumar, Appani Sarath, Nikki Hulowski, Sreenivasan - everyone manages to create an impression". The Times of India gave the film a rating of three-and-a-half out of five stars and stated that "And The Oscar Goes To is a story of big dreams, perseverance and challenges. For those looking for some inspiration to dare to aim high, which makes most of us, it would be an apt pick for the weekend." The film dubbed in Telugu with same title and released on Aha

Awards and nominations

References

External links

2019 films
Indian drama films
2010s Malayalam-language films
Films set in Los Angeles
Films shot in Los Angeles